Captain Guy Wilbraham Wareing  (23 July 1899 – 27 October 1918) was a British World War I flying ace credited with nine aerial victories.

Biography
Wareing was born in Latchford, Warrington, Lancashire, the son of Frederick William Wareing, an engineer, and his wife Jessie Mary.

On 30 August 1917 he was commissioned from cadet to temporary second lieutenant (on probation) on the General List to serve in the Royal Flying Corps, being confirmed in his rank and appointed a flying officer on 14 February 1918.

Wareing was posted to No. 29 Squadron RAF in June 1918 to fly the S.E.5a single-seat fighter. He gained his first victory on 12 August, destroying a Pfalz D.III fighter over Ploegsteert, Belgium. After destroying two reconnaissance aircraft and driving another down out of control, Wareing became both an ace and a balloon buster by destroying an observation balloon over Gheluvelt on 7 September 1918. He then sent a Fokker D.VII down in flames, and destroyed three more balloons, two of them on two separate sorties on 29 September. He was appointed a temporary captain on 7 October 1918.

On 27 October 1918 Wareing was killed when he was shot down by a Fokker D.VII flown by Leutnant Josef Raesch of Jasta 43. He is buried in the churchyard of Église Sainte-Marie-Madeleine, Rumillies, Tournai, Hainaut, Belgium, where his is the only Commonwealth War Grave.

Wareing's award of the Distinguished Flying Cross was gazetted posthumously on 3 December 1918. His citation read:
Lieutenant Guy Wilbraham Wareing.
"A bold and courageous airman who has destroyed four enemy aeroplanes and shot down in flames a hostile balloon. He is conspicuous for zeal and devotion to duty."

List of aerial victories

References

Bibliography
 

1899 births
1918 deaths
People from Warrington
Royal Flying Corps officers
Royal Air Force personnel of World War I
British World War I flying aces
British military personnel killed in World War I
Aviators killed by being shot down
Recipients of the Distinguished Flying Cross (United Kingdom)